Rhopobota stagnana is a moth belonging to the family Tortricidae. The species was first described by Michael Denis and Ignaz Schiffermüller in 1775.

It is native to the Palearctic including  Europe.

The wingspan is 12-18 millimeters. The forewings have small white cross-spots along the costal edge, the basal part is slightly darker brown, and there is one evenly wide, brown, slanted cross-band slightly outside the middle. The hindwings are pale brown.

This species has two generations each year, flying respectively from April to June and in August-September. The larvae feed on Succisa pratensis, the first generation of larvae on the leaf rosettes and the second generation on the flower heads.

References

Eucosmini